Annie Maynard (born 30 October 1981) is an Australian actress. She is best known for her starring role in the ABC comedy series Upper Middle Bogan as Bess Denyar.

Upper Middle Bogan began screening on ABC on 15 August 2013 with Maynard reprising her role across all three seasons. Currently Maynard is filming the upcoming Australian drama television series Playing for Keeps.

Early life 
Born in Adelaide, Maynard did two years at Flinders University Drama Centre.

In 2002 Maynard was accepted to the National Institute of Dramatic Art (NIDA) and graduated in 2004.

Career 
Maynard has amassed a number of credits across various Australian television series including Love Child, A Moody Christmas, Rake 3, Puberty Blues, Paper Giants: The Birth of Cleo, Spirited 2, Tricky Business, Dead Lucky, Upper Middle Bogan and All Saints.

Personal life 
Maynard has one child, a son, born in 2014.

References

External links

Australian television actresses
Living people
National Institute of Dramatic Art alumni
Actresses from Adelaide
1981 births